Film Songs is an EP by American singer-songwriter Stan Ridgway. It was released on January 20, 1996 by TWA Records and comprises songs Ridgway composed for various films and two live performance tracks.

Track listing

Personnel
Adapted from the Film Songs liner notes.

Musicians
Joseph Berardi – drums, percussion
Stan Ridgway – lead vocals, acoustic guitar, harmonica, production (1-6)
Mark Schulz – electric guitar, backing vocals
David Sutton – electric bass, acoustic bass, backing vocals
Pietra Wexstun – keyboards, backing vocals

Production and additional personnel
Mitchell Froom – production (7)
John Gillingham – recording (6, 7)
Shelley Roye – cover art, design
Doug Schwartz – mastering

Release history

References

External links 
 Film Songs at Discogs (list of releases)

1997 debut EPs
Stan Ridgway albums
Albums produced by Stan Ridgway